Clement Lemieux is a Canadian volleyball coach. He coached the Canada men's national volleyball team from 1992 to 1996.

See also
 Canada men's national volleyball team

References

1961 births
Living people
Canadian sports coaches